Lukas Immanuel Kampa (born 29 November 1986) is a German professional volleyball player. He is a member of the Germany national team, a bronze medallist at the 2014 World Championship and named the Best Setter of the tournament. At the professional club level, he plays for Trefl Gdańsk.

Personal life
Kampa was born in Bochum, West Germany as a son of Ulrich Kampa – a former volleyball player. He has a sister and a brother David, who is also a volleyball player.

Career
In 2014, Kampa signed a contract with the Polish PlusLiga team, Cerrad Czarni Radom. In 2016, he joined Jastrzębski Węgiel.

Honours

Clubs
 National championships
 2008/2009  German Championship, with VfB Friedrichshafen
 2009/2010  German Championship, with VfB Friedrichshafen
 2012/2013  Russian Cup, with Belogorie Belgorod
 2012/2013  Ukrainian Championship, with Lokomotiv Kharkiv
 2020/2021  Polish Championship, with Jastrzębski Węgiel

Individual awards
 2014: FIVB World Championship – Best Setter
 2015: German Volleyball Player of the Year
 2017: German Volleyball Player of the Year

References

External links

 
 Player profile at LegaVolley.it 
 Player profile at PlusLiga.pl 
 Player profile at Volleybox.net

1986 births
Living people
Sportspeople from Bochum
German men's volleyball players
Olympic volleyball players of Germany
Volleyball players at the 2012 Summer Olympics
European Games medalists in volleyball
Volleyball players at the 2015 European Games
European Games gold medalists for Germany
German expatriate sportspeople in Italy
Expatriate volleyball players in Italy
German expatriate sportspeople in Russia
Expatriate volleyball players in Russia
German expatriate sportspeople in Ukraine
Expatriate volleyball players in Ukraine
German expatriate sportspeople in Poland
Expatriate volleyball players in Poland
VC Belogorie players
VC Lokomotyv Kharkiv players
Modena Volley players
Czarni Radom players
Jastrzębski Węgiel players
Trefl Gdańsk players
Setters (volleyball)